Yangaliny Jiménez Domínguez (born 2 March 1979) is a Cuban Paralympic judoka. He represented Cuba at the 2012 Summer Paralympics in London, United Kingdom and at the 2016 Summer Paralympics in Rio de Janeiro, Brazil. He won two medals: the bronze medal in the men's +100 kg event in 2012 and the bronze medal in the men's +100 kg event in 2016.

He also competed at the Parapan American Games winning the gold medal both in 2011 and in 2015 in the men's +100 kg event.

References

External links 
 

Living people
1979 births
Place of birth missing (living people)
Cuban male judoka
Judoka at the 2012 Summer Paralympics
Judoka at the 2016 Summer Paralympics
Medalists at the 2012 Summer Paralympics
Medalists at the 2016 Summer Paralympics
Paralympic bronze medalists for Cuba
Paralympic medalists in judo
Paralympic judoka of Cuba
Medalists at the 2011 Parapan American Games
Medalists at the 2015 Parapan American Games